Paolo Bianchessi (born 17 January 1981) is an Italian judoka.

Achievements

External links
 
 

1981 births
Living people
Italian male judoka
Judoka at the 2004 Summer Olympics
Judoka at the 2008 Summer Olympics
Olympic judoka of Italy
Mediterranean Games silver medalists for Italy
Mediterranean Games medalists in judo
Competitors at the 2005 Mediterranean Games
Judoka of Centro Sportivo Carabinieri
20th-century Italian people
21st-century Italian people